Maayavan is a 2017 Indian Tamil-language science fiction thriller film co written, produced and directed by C. V. Kumar. The film stars Sundeep Kishan and Lavanya Tripathi while Jackie Shroff, Daniel Balaji, Mime Gopi, R. Amarendran, Bagavathi Perumal, and Jayaprakash play supporting roles. The film features music composed by Ghibran, cinematography by Gopi Amarnath, and editing by Leo John Paul. The film was launched in February 2016 and released on 14 December 2017. It was dubbed in Telugu as Project Z. The film had an average opening at the Chennai Box office.

Plot 
The film commences with the demise of a prominent neurologist named Pramodh (R. Amarendran). His gym trainer Dheena (Sai Dheena) is seen paying respects at the funeral before leaving. The plot then shifts to a young crime inspector named Kumaran (Sundeep Kishan), who is chasing a petty thief and witnesses Dheena murdering his wife. Kumaran chases Dheena, who corners him and halts him with a blow to his head. In an ensuing tussle, Kumaran manages to kill Dheena.

A meeting with psychiatrist Aadhirai (Lavanya Tripathi) ends on a rough note when she deems him medically unfit to rejoin the police force. Later, when he faces symptoms which attribute to PTSD, he mends his ways with Aadhirai, who helps him overcome his disorder. A second murder happens in which a famous actress, Vishma (Akshara Gowda) is killed. Kumaran visits the spot and gets stressed and shocked upon finding similar bloodstains from the earlier murder and the same brand of cigarette smoked by the murderer. Aadhirai finds him, treats him for his PTSD, and makes him normal. Kumaran meets with Rudhran (Daniel Balaji) and introduces Aadhirai to him as a motivational speaker. Kumaran, now fitter, sets out his investigation and finds that a makeup man named Gopi (Mime Gopi) must have done the murder as he is the prime suspect. Upon investigation, he gets to know that Gopi and Dheena showed a different behavior a few days before they committed the murders. Kumaran tracks down Gopi, but he jumps to his death before confessing anything.

The next murder happens, and the victim is another scientist named Narayanan (Kathi Ravi). Kumaran tries to find shreds of evidence in Narayanan's home and finds a book written by Rudhran. Thinking that Rudhran might know the scientist, Kumaran visits his office and finds that his behavior has changed. His dog starts to bark at him, and he has also started to smoke recently, that too the same brand that was found in the earlier murders. Kumaran deduces that some strange thing is happening, and Rudhran could either be murdered or become the next murderer. He nabs Rudhran when he shows his more ruthless and cold-blooded side when he kills his dog. Kumaran takes Rudhran into custody. While signing on the FIR, Rudhran signs a different name but corrects it to his sign. Kumaran notices this and finds out that the first sign was signed "Pramodh".

A brief investigation reveals that Pramodh is a late colleague of Narayanan. They worked together at the Indian Institute of Neurosciences. A senior official named Velayudham (Jayaprakash) reveals that Pramodh was involved in a project called Project Maayavan, which could enable a person to store their memories into a hard drive, which can be transferred to another individual by injecting a gel which would house millions of nano-transmitters. When injected into the brain, these transmitters will attach to the neurons. When the person dies, their memories could be transmitted to another individual whose brain would already have been injected with the gel. The memories of the new person will first be erased, and the old person's memories will be transferred via the nano-transmitters. This way the person (their memories) will not die and will instead live forever.

To prove his theory, Pramodh works day and night. During this experiment, he sends a patient into a coma but is not bothered about human life and instead wants to succeed in his mission. After Narayanan becomes the Director of the Indian Institute of Neurosciences, he stops Pramodh's project. Pramodh uses himself as the subject, transfers his memories in a hard drive, and commits suicide. Once he dies, his memories get transferred to his trainer, and then to Gopi and then Rudhran. Kumaran solves this and finds that the next target is Army general Major Sathyan (Jackie Shroff). Pramodh, who is living in Rudhran's body, commits suicide and arrives in Sathyan's brain. Sathyan invites Kumaran and says that his technology will let him live for more than 1000 years, and no one can stop him. With a clue from Pramodh's wife, Kumaran finds his secret lab where Pramodh has his memories stored. Pramodh successfully retrieves the hard drive containing his memories, which includes blackmailing and later killing Kumaran's friend Karna (Bagavathi Perumal). He then kidnaps Velayudham and goes to the institute lab to let him switch to another body. Kumaran tracks him down, and a gunfight ensues. Finally, Kumaran realizes that Aadhirai is the next subject. If Sathyan dies, then Pramodh's memories will transfer to Aadhirai's body, leaving Kumaran with a difficult choice.

20 years later, Kumaran is happily married to Aadhirai who is celebrating her 40th birthday with their son. It is shown that Kumaran has trapped Sathyan in his basement and has kept him alive.

Cast

Production 
Film producer C. V. Kumar began his first directorial project in June 2014 and signed on Naveen Chandra to play the lead role. The film began production during the same month and was titled Mayavan, with K. S. G. Venkatesh also signed on to play a pivotal role. Santhosh Narayanan was revealed to be the film's music composer and the launch event was attended by a few of the producer's close friends. The film was later delayed and subsequently shelved.

C. V. Kumar began working on the film again during September 2015, when it was announced that Sundeep Kishan would replace Naveen in the lead role, while Kumar would produce the film alongside the studio, Studio Green. Kumar revealed that he had also approached Vijay Sethupathi to essay the lead role, but his unavailability prompted him to sign on Sundeep. The team initially tried to sign actress Lavanya Tripathi to play the lead female role, but her busy schedule meant that the team went on to hold unsuccessful negotiations with actresses Keerthy Suresh and Amyra Dastur for the role. Taapsee Pannu then signed on to appear in the leading female role, while Kumar worked on the script alongside Nalan Kumarasamy, who wrote the venture's dialogues and screenplay. However, the film became delayed further and evaded its starting date in October.

Lavanya Tripathi later became available and signed on to play the leading female role after Taapsee became busy with her commitments in Hindi films during February 2016. The film was officially launched in mid February 2016, with Mohamaad Ghibran announced as the film's composer and Gopi Amarnath as the cinematographer Daniel Balaji, Jayaprakash, Bagavathi Perumal, and Mime Gopi were also added to the cast, as the film began production in Chennai.

Soundtrack 
There are three songs, excluding the theme music, as follows. The music is composed by Ghibran and  includes the playback debut by North American singers Shweta Subram and Abby V in Mella Mella.

Release 
After some unavoidable slight delays, film finally slated to release on 14th Dec 2017. It was dubbed and released in Hindi with the same title in 2019. The satellite rights of the Hindi version was sold to Star India.

Critical reception
The film received positive reviews from critics. M. Suganth of The Times of India gave 3.5 stars out of 5 stating, "One of the best things about Maayavan is how it manages to keep us guessing until it reveals the killer". Baradwaj Rangan of Film Companion wrote "CV Kumar has terrific instincts as a producer — he single-handedly created a parallel economy from sensible, stylish, low-budget cinema. But as a filmmaker, he’s functional at best."

References

www.onlineinternet.com
www.compareatoz.com

External links 
 
 

2017 films
2010s Tamil-language films
2010s science fiction thriller films
Indian science fiction thriller films
Films scored by Mohamaad Ghibran
Indian mystery thriller films
Techno-thriller films
2010s mystery thriller films
Films about murder
2017 directorial debut films